William L. Carr (April 1, 1878 – April 14, 1921) was an American private serving in the United States Marine Corps during the Boxer Rebellion who received the Medal of Honor for bravery.

Biography
Carr was born April 1, 1878, in Peabody, Massachusetts, and enlisted in the Marine Corps from Boston on June 7, 1898. After entering the Marine Corps he was sent to fight in the Chinese Boxer Rebellion.

He received his medal for his actions in Peking from July 21 – August 17, 1900. The medal was presented to him December 11, 1901. He was discharged from the Marine Corps in Boston as a corporal on June 10, 1903.

He died April 14, 1921, and is buried in the Ohio Veterans Home Cemetery, Sandusky, Ohio. His grave can be found in section F, row 7, grave 37.

Medal of Honor citation
Rank and organization: Private, U.S. Marine Corps. Born: 1 April 1875, Peabody, Mass. Accredited to: Massachusetts. G.O. No.: 55, 19 July 1901.

Citation:

In action at Peking, China, 21 July to 17 August 1900. Throughout this action and in the presence of the enemy, Carr distinguished himself by his conduct.

See also

List of Medal of Honor recipients
List of Medal of Honor recipients for the Boxer Rebellion

References

External links

1878 births
1921 deaths
United States Marine Corps Medal of Honor recipients
United States Marine Corps non-commissioned officers
American military personnel of the Boxer Rebellion
People from Peabody, Massachusetts
Boxer Rebellion recipients of the Medal of Honor